Detha railway station is located in Detha village, Hyderabad district  of Sindh province, Pakistan.

Detha community belongs to Cāraṇa caste in hindu religion. Detha people live in Pakistan and also in India. In India, they are densely populated in Barmer, Jaisalmer, Nagaur (particularly in navad, tosina, kuchaman etc).

See also
 List of railway stations in Pakistan
 Pakistan Railways

References

External links

Railway stations in Hyderabad District, Pakistan
Railway stations on Karachi–Peshawar Line (ML 1)